Agaricus pilatianus is a rare species of poisonous mushroom found in Europe. It is a white to cream colour that discolours when cut, bruised or damaged.

External links 
 Rogers Mushrooms – Agaricus pilatinanus Mushroom

pilatianus
Poisonous fungi